Kim Min-seok (born January 24, 1990) is a South Korean actor. He played the role of the main character in Shark: The Beginning (2021). He had supporting roles in television series such as Flower Band (2012), Descendants of the Sun, The Doctors (2016) and Innocent Defendant (2017).

Career
Kim participated in Superstar K 3, a survival audition show for singers on Mnet. He showed up at the preliminary regional audition in Daegu but never made it to the group of 11 contestants that actually competed in the show. Shortly after, Kim made his debut in tvN's music youth series Flower Band, playing an ambitious keyboard player.

He gained recognition with his role in the pan-Asia hit drama Descendants of the Sun. The same year, he starred in SBS' medical drama The Doctors and won the Best New Actor award at the 53rd Baeksang Arts Awards.

In 2017, Kim played supporting roles in SBS' legal thriller Innocent Defendant, JTBC's coming-of-age drama Hello, My Twenties! 2 and tvN's romantic comedy series Because This Is My First Life. On November 16, 2017, it was reported that Kim's contract with Woollim Entertainment had expired and he had not renewed with the company. It was later reported that he had signed to Respect Entertainment.

In 2018, Kim played his first lead role in the drama special Almost Touching. In December 2018, Kim enlisted in the military to serve his conscripted duty.

In September 2020, Kim joined the cast of multi-season rom-com web series City Couple's Way of Love of Kakao TV, which will depict the real love stories of young people who live fiercely with "another me" in a complex city. The first series Lovestruck in the City is set to air on December 8, 2020 and it will be available for streaming on Netflix also.

In 2021, Kim's upcoming film Shark: The Beginning will be released on Original Film TVING, which will premiere in June 2021. and Kim will be Cameo appearing in the drama Racket Boys.In June 2021, Kim confirmed to appear in Engine On From Today, airing on KakaoTV with a total of four episodes.

In 2022, Kim renewed his contract with Respect Entertainment.

Filmography

Film

Television series

Web series

Television show

Hosting

Music video appearances

Discography

Soundtrack

Awards and nominations

References

External links

1990 births
Living people
South Korean male television actors
South Korean male film actors
South Korean male web series actors
Best New Actor Paeksang Arts Award (television) winners